Matthew Di Leo (born March 2, 1995) is a Canadian racing driver from Barrie, Ontario.

After karting, Di Leo began racing in the U.S. F2000 National Championship in 2011 for Brian Stewart Racing. and finished fifth in points with a podium finish in Baltimore. That winter he had finished third in the U.S. F2000 Winterfest. In 2012 he returned to U.S. F2000, this time driving for his own MDL Racing team. He finished ninth in the Winterfest and then finished fourth in points in the main championship, with four podium finishes and was running at the finish of all but one race. During the 2013 winter he competed in the 24 Hours of Dubai and the 2013 U.S. F2000 Winterfest where he finished eighth. On April 9, 2013 he completed his first Firestone Indy Lights test at Buttonwillow Raceway and on April 16 announced that he would compete in the Long Beach Indy Lights race the following weekend. Starting ninth in the ten-car field, he finished fifth in the race.

U.S. F2000 National Championship

Indy Lights

References

External links

Living people
1995 births
Racing drivers from Ontario
Sportspeople from Barrie
Indy Lights drivers
U.S. F2000 National Championship drivers